Minnette Barrett (March 25, 1880 - June 20, 1964) was an American actress.  She primarily appeared on stage and in vaudeville, though she also had a few film appearances.  She appeared in vaudeville with Joe Jefferson Jr. and Florence Nash.

During World War II she led the American Theatre Wing's war bonds drive.

Selected appearances
 Mr. Buttles (1910)
 Mother (1910) as Ardath Wetherill
 In 1999 (1912) (playlet)
Salvation Nell (1915)
 The Ragamuffin (1916)
 The Bat (1920, and 1937 revival)
 The Show Off
 Lovely Lady (1925)
 Desire Under the Elms (1952 revival)
 Mrs. McThing (1953)

References

External links

1880 births
1964 deaths
American film actresses
American stage actresses
20th-century American actresses
Vaudeville performers